Robert Nelson "Bobby" Ussery (born September 3, 1935 in Vian, Oklahoma) is a retired American Thoroughbred horse racing hall of fame jockey. His first race as a professional jockey came at Fair Grounds Race Course in New Orleans on November 22, 1951, where he rode Reticule to victory in the Thanksgiving Handicap. By the end of the decade, he had won the Travers, Whitney and Alabama Stakes.

Riding Windfields Farm's colt New Providence, in 1959 he won Canada's most prestigious race, the Queen's Plate. The horse went on to win the Canadian Triple Crown, although Avelino Gomez took the mount for the final two legs.

Ussery's best finish in the Belmont Stakes was in 1959 aboard the colt Bagdad. In 1960, he won the Hopeful Stakes aboard that year's Eclipse Award 2-year-old champion, Hail To Reason. That same year, he rode Bally Ache to victory in the Florida Derby and the Flamingo Stakes en route to a second-place finish in the Kentucky Derby and then a win in the Preakness Stakes.

In 1967, Ussery won the Kentucky Derby on Proud Clarion and finished first in 1968 aboard Dancer's Image. However, phenylbutazone, a substance banned in Kentucky at that time but later sanctioned after it was proven not to affect a horse's performance, was found in Dancer's Image's post-race urine test. Dancer's Image was disqualified and listed as having finished last.

Ussery was so noted for guiding horses to the outside of the track, near the crown, then diving toward the rail and opening them up on the far turn at Aqueduct Race Track that it was soon dubbed "Ussery's Alley", specifically for riding a horse on the far outside.

Ussery retired in 1974 with 3,611 race wins. In 1980, he was inducted into the National Museum of Racing and Hall of Fame. In 2011, he was inducted into the Oklahoma Horse Racing Hall of Fame.

References

American jockeys
United States Thoroughbred Racing Hall of Fame inductees
People from Sequoyah County, Oklahoma
1935 births
Living people